Several genealogical numbering systems have been widely adopted for presenting family trees and pedigree charts in text format.

Ascending numbering systems

Ahnentafel

Ahnentafel, also known as the Eytzinger Method, Sosa Method, and Sosa-Stradonitz Method, allows for the numbering of ancestors beginning with a descendant. This system allows one to derive an ancestor's number without compiling the complete list, and allows one to derive an ancestor's relationship based on their number. The number of a person's father is twice their own number, and the number of a person's mother is twice their own, plus one. For instance, if John Smith is 10, his father is 20, and his mother is 21.

In order to readily have the generation stated for a certain person, the Ahnentafel numbering may be preceded by the generation. This method's usefulness becomes apparent when applied further back in the generations: e.g. 08-146, is a male preceding the subject by 7 (8-1) generations. This ancestor was the father of a woman (146/2=73) (in the genealogical line of the subject), who was the mother of a man (73/2=36.5), further down the line the father of a man (36/2=18), father of a woman (18/2=9), mother of a man (9/2=4.5), father of the subject's father (4/2=2). Hence, 08-146 is the subject's father's father's mother's father's father's mother's father.

The atree or Binary Ahnentafel method is based on the same numbering of nodes, but first converts the numbers to binary notation and then converts each 0 to M (for Male) and each 1 to F (for Female). The first character of each code (shown as X in the table below) is M if the subject is male and F if the subject is female. For example 5 becomes 101 and then FMF (or MMF if the subject is male). An advantage of this system is easier understanding of the genealogical path.

The first 15 codes in each system, identifying individuals in four generations, are as follows:

Surname methods
Genealogical writers sometimes choose to present ancestral lines by carrying back individuals with their spouses or single families generation by generation. The siblings of the individual or individuals studied may or may not be named for each family. This method is most popular in simplified single surname studies, however, allied surnames of major family branches may be carried back as well. In general, numbers are assigned only to the primary individual studied in each generation.

Descending numbering systems

Register System
The Register System uses both common numerals (1, 2, 3, 4) and Roman numerals (i, ii, iii, iv). The system is organized by generation, i.e., generations are grouped separately.

The system was created in 1870 for use in the New England Historical and Genealogical Register published by the New England Historic Genealogical Society based in Boston, Massachusetts. Register Style, of which the numbering system is part, is one of two major styles used in the U.S. for compiling descending genealogies. (The other being the NGSQ System.)

       (–Generation One–) 
 1 Progenitor
      2     i  Child
           ii  Child (no progeny)
          iii  Child (no progeny)
      3    iv  Child

       (–Generation Two–)
 2 Child
            i  Grandchild (no progeny)
           ii  Grandchild (no progeny)
 3 Child
      4     i  Grandchild

       (–Generation Three–)
 4 Grandchild
      5     i  Great-grandchild
           ii  Great-grandchild (no progeny)
      6   iii  Great-grandchild
      7    iv  Great-grandchild

NGSQ System
The NGSQ System gets its name from the National Genealogical Society Quarterly published by the National Genealogical Society headquartered in Falls Church, Virginia, which uses the method in its articles.  It is sometimes called the "Record System" or the "Modified Register System" because it derives from the Register System. The most significant difference between the NGSQ and the Register Systems is in the method of numbering for children who are not carried forward into future generations: The NGSQ System assigns a number to every child, whether or not that child is known to have progeny, and the Register System does not. Other differences between the two systems are mostly stylistic.

       (–Generation One–) 
 1 Progenitor
   +  2     i  Child
      3    ii  Child (no progeny)
      4   iii  Child (no progeny)
   +  5    iv  Child

       (–Generation Two–)
 2 Child
      6     i  Grandchild (no progeny)
      7    ii  Grandchild (no progeny)
 5 Child
   +  8     i  Grandchild

       (–Generation Three–)
 8 Grandchild
   +  9     i  Great-grandchild
     10    ii  Great-grandchild (no progeny)
   + 11   iii  Great-grandchild
   + 12    iv  Great-grandchild

Henry System
The Henry System is a descending system created by Reginald Buchanan Henry for a genealogy of the families of the presidents of the United States that he wrote in 1935. It can be organized either by generation or not. The system begins with 1. The oldest child becomes 11, the next child is 12, and so on. The oldest child of 11 is 111, the next 112, and so on. The system allows one to derive an ancestor's relationship based on their number.  For example, 621 is the first child of 62, who is the second child of 6, who is the sixth child of his parents.

In the Henry System, when there are more than nine children, X is used for the 10th child, A is used for the 11th child, B is used for the 12th child, and so on. In the Modified Henry System, when there are more than nine children, numbers greater than nine are placed in parentheses.

 Henry		                   Modified Henry
 1. Progenitor 		               1. Progenitor 
    11. Child		                  11. Child
        111. Grandchild		              111. Grandchild
             1111. Great-grandchild                1111. Great-grandchild
             1112. Great-grandchild                1112. Great-grandchild
        112. Grandchild		              112. Grandchild
    12. Child		                  12. Child
        121. Grandchild		              121. Grandchild
             1211. Great-grandchild                1211. Great-grandchild
             1212. Great-grandchild                1212. Great-grandchild
        122. Grandchild		              122. Grandchild
             1221. Great-grandchild                1221. Great-grandchild
        123. Grandchild		              123. Grandchild
        124. Grandchild		              124. Grandchild
        125. Grandchild		              125. Grandchild
        126. Grandchild		              126. Grandchild
        127. Grandchild		              127. Grandchild
        128. Grandchild		              128. Grandchild
        129. Grandchild		              129. Grandchild
        12X. Grandchild		              12(10). Grandchild

d'Aboville System
The d'Aboville System is a descending numbering method developed by Jacques d'Aboville in 1940 that is very similar to the Henry System, widely used in France. It can be organized either by generation or not. It differs from the Henry System in that periods are used to separate the generations and no changes in numbering are needed for families with more than nine children. For example:

 1 Progenitor
   1.1 Child
       1.1.1 Grandchild
             1.1.1.1 Great-grandchild
             1.1.1.2 Great-grandchild
       1.1.2 Grandchild
   1.2 Child
       1.2.1 Grandchild
             1.2.1.1 Great-grandchild
             1.2.1.2 Great-grandchild
       1.2.2 Grandchild
             1.2.2.1 Great-grandchild
       1.2.3 Grandchild
       1.2.4 Grandchild
       1.2.5 Grandchild
       1.2.6 Grandchild
       1.2.7 Grandchild
       1.2.8 Grandchild
       1.2.9 Grandchild
       1.2.10 Grandchild

Meurgey de Tupigny System

Each generation is identified by a Roman numeral (I, II, III, ...), and each child and cousin in the same generation carrying the same surname is identified by an Arabic numeral. The numbering system usually appears on or in conjunction with a pedigree chart. Example:

 I Progenitor
   II-1 Child
        III-1 Grandchild
              IV-1  Great-grandchild
              IV-2  Great-grandchild 
        III-2 Grandchild
        III-3 Grandchild
        III-4 Grandchild
   II-2 Child
        III-5 Grandchild
              IV-3  Great-grandchild
              IV-4  Great-grandchild 
              IV-5  Great-grandchild
        III-6 Grandchild

de Villiers/Pama System
The de Villiers/Pama System gives letters to generations, and then numbers children in birth order.  For example:

 a Progenitor
   b1 Child
      c1 Grandchild
         d1 Great-grandchild
         d2 Great-grandchild
      c2 Grandchild
      c3 Grandchild
   b2 Child
      c1 Grandchild
         d1 Great-grandchild
         d2 Great-grandchild
         d3 Great-grandchild
      c2 Grandchild
      c3 Grandchild

In this system, b2.c3 is the third child of the second child, and is one of the progenitor's grandchildren.

The de Villiers/Pama system is the standard for genealogical works in South Africa. It was developed in the 19th century by Christoffel Coetzee de Villiers and used in his three volume Geslachtregister der Oude Kaapsche Familien (Genealogies of Old Cape Families). The system was refined by Dr. Cornelis (Cor) Pama, one of the founding members of the Genealogical Society of South Africa.

See also
Ancestral File Number
Ahnentafel
Cousin chart (Table of consanguinity)
Family tree 
Family tree mapping 
GEDCOM
Genogram 
Kinship terminology
Pedigree chart
Pedigree collapse
Numerical variation in kinship terms

References

Sources

About.com: Numbering Your Family Tree
Numbering Systems in Genealogy  by Richard A. Pence

External links
Encyclopedia of Genealogy-Numbering Systems
Numbering Systems in Genealogy 

Genealogy
Genealogy